Sweden played a role of major importance during the Cold War, despite not officially participating. Sweden's location made it an ideal base of operations for both the Soviet Union and the United States. Sweden was never invaded throughout the war, mainly due to their strong defensive power - ranked among the top five in the world at this time.

Army

Small arms

Armored fighting vehicles 
The Swedish army during the Cold War possessed more or less 24,000 ground vehicles, including 2,354 tanks, 1,257 armored fighting vehicles, and up to 20,000 utility vehicles.

Artillery and mortars

Coastal defence
The eastern coast of Sweden, along a length of more than 1500 kilometres, probably had the most powerful coastal defence system in the world. The system consisted of coastal artillery, submarines, battleships and aircraft. No less than 90 heavy cannons (typically 7.5 cm cannons) with large underground facilities were strategically located along the coast, together with a large number of bunkers and pillboxes.

Navy 
The Swedish navy possessed a total of 129 ships between 1945 and 1991.

Seaplane cruisers

Cruisers 
Sweden possessed four cruisers throughout the Cold War.

Destroyers 
Sweden had a total of 35 destroyer-class vessels throughout the Cold War, most of them World War II models. As time went on, Sweden begun to put less effort in keeping large surface combatants and instead increasingly relied on patrol boats, fast attack craft, coastal artillery and air superiority. However this approach (especially the overreliance on lighter surface combatants) was somewhat discredited by the early 1980s. Attempts were then made to move back towards heavier more capable surface combatants (e.g. the Ytstridsfartyg Större [Surface Combatant Large] program), but this was ultimately curtailed by the sudden end to the Cold War.

Destroyers in 1945: 28
Destroyers in 1950: 21
Destroyers in 1960: 24
Destroyers in 1970: 17
Destroyers in 1980: 13
Destroyers in 1991: 0

Coastal defense ships 

The Swedish navy maintained 7 coastal defense ships after World War II, though some were taken out of service shortly after.
Oscar II-class coastal defense ship (1)
HSwMS Oscar II (1905-1950)
 (3)
 (1921-1957)
 (1922-1957)
 (1915-1953)
 (3)
HSwMS Manligheten (1904-1950)
HSwMS Tapperheten (1903-1947)
HSwMS Äran (1902-1947)

Corvettes 

The Swedish navy had as few as six corvettes in service during the Cold War, relying on larger vessels during this time.
 (4)
HSwMS Gävle (1990–present)
HSwMS Göteborg (1990–present)
HSwMS Kalmar (1990–present)
 (1991–present)
 (2)
HSwMS Malmö (1985–present)
HSwMS Stockholm (1984–present)

Mine warfare vessels 

Sweden possessed 19 mine warfare vessels throughout the time period 1945-1991.
HSwMS Alnösund minelayer
HSwMS Arkösund minelayer
HSwMS Barösund minelayer
HSwMS Grundsund minelayer
HSwMS Furusund minelayer
HSwMS Fårösund minelayer
HSwMS Kalmarsund minelayer
HSwMS Kalvsund minelayer
HSwMS Skramsösund minelayer
HSwMS Älvsborg minelayer
HSwMS Älvsnabben minelayer
HSwMS Öresund minelayer
 (7)
HSwMS Arholma (1984-2010)
HSwMS Koster (1986–present)
HSwMS Kullen (1986–present)
HSwMS Landsort (1982–present)
HSwMS Ulvön (1980s-present)
HSwMS Ven (1980s-present)
HSwMS Vinga (1980s-present)

Patrol boats 

Seventeen patrol boats were in service in the Royal Swedish Navy between 1945 and 1991.

HSwMS Hugin
HSwMS Jägaren
HSwMS Kaparen
HSwMS Magne
HSwMS Mjölner
HSwMS Mode
HSwMS Munin
HSwMS Mysing
HSwMS Snapphanen
HSwMS Spejaren
HSwMS Starkodder
HSwMS Styrbjörn
HSwMS Tirfing
HSwMS Tordön
HSwMS Vale
HSwMS Vidar
HSwMS Väktaren

Torpedo boats 

Sweden had 12 torpedo boats during the Cold War.

 (1)
HSwMS Perseus
 (11)
HSwMS Alderbaran
HSwMS Altair
HSwMS Antares
HSwMS Arcturus
HSwMS Argo
HSwMS Astrea
HSwMS Plejad
HSwMS Polaris
HSwMS Pollux
HSwMS Regulus
HSwMS Rigel

Submarines 

Sweden had a total of 26 submarines throughout the Cold War.
 (5)
 (6)
HSwMS Bävern
HSwMS Hajen
HSwMS Illern
HSwMS Sälen
HSwMS Uttern
HSwMS Valen
Neptun-class submarine (3)
 (3)
HSwMS Najad
HSwMS Neptun

 (5)
HSwMS Sjöbjörnen
HSwMS Sjöhunden
HSwMS Sjöhästen
HSwMS Sjölejonet

 (4)
HSwMS Helsingland
HSwMS Södermanland
HSwMS Västergötland
HSwMS Östergötland

Auxiliary vessels 

HSwMS Arkösund minelayer
 submarine salvage vessel
 minelayer
 ice-strengthened patrol craft
 command/auxiliary ship
Landing Craft L-50 mechanized landing craft (5)

Air force 
Sweden had a huge air force - the fourth largest in the world - throughout the Cold War, consisting of more than 4,000 aircraft. Out of these, no less than 3,574 aircraft were armed fighters along with many hundred bombers.

Fighter aircraft

Bomber aircraft 

Saab 17 bomber & reconnaissance aircraft - 323
Saab 18 twin-engine bomber - 245

Trainers 

Saab 105 trainer aircraft - 80

Transport aircraft 

Lockheed C-130 - 8

Helicopters 

Piasecki Hkp 1 transport helicopter - 14
Bell Hkp 3 utility helicopter - 29
Boeing-Vertol Hkp 4 transport helicopter - 21
Eurocopter Hkp 10 utility helicopter - 12

See also 
List of military equipment of Sweden
Military equipment of Sweden during World War II
Military on Gotland

Notes

References

Sources and further reading 
http://www.bismarck-class.dk/other_craft_involved/swedish_ship_involved/swedish_ship_involved.html
https://web.archive.org/web/20100813230614/http://www.f10kamratforening.se/Kamrat/Word/?page_id=407
http://www.globalaircraft.org/planes/saab_37_viggen.pl
http://www.militaryfactory.com/armor/detail.asp?armor_id=104
https://web.archive.org/web/20100827173632/http://www.sfhm.se/templates/pages/FlygStandardPage1807.aspx?epslanguage=EN
https://web.archive.org/web/20120108040052/http://www.sphf.se/Axvall/74.htm

Military equipment of Sweden